The Roman Catholic Diocese of Ciudad Juárez is located in the northern Mexican city of the same name, across the Río Grande from El Paso, Texas.  It is part of the ecclesiastical province of Chihuahua and is a suffragan diocese of the Archdiocese of Chihuahua .

History

The Diocese of Ciudad Juárez was erected by Pope Pius XII on 10 April 1957 from the Diocese of Chihuahua because of the population growth in the northern part of the state of Chihuahua.  Pope Pius named Manuel Talamás Camandari  as the first bishop, and by 1966 he was overseeing a diocese of 565,000 faithful.  When Bishop Talamás retired in 1992, the diocese consisted of more than one million Catholics.

Juan Sandoval Íñiguez was selected by Pope John Paul II to succeed Talamás as second bishop on 11 July 1992, but remained for less than two years before being transferred to Guadalajara to replace the assassinated archbishop, Cardinal Juan Jesús Posadas Ocampo on 21 April 1994. His successor was Renato Ascencio León , who had been subsequently the bishop of the neighboring Diocese of Cuauhtémoc-Madera, Chihuahua.  Bishop Ascencio was installed on 7 October 1994, and administers a diocese with a Catholic population(2006) of 2,179,000.

Demographics

According to the Church census of 2016, the diocese is also made up of 116 priests, 73 parishes, 170 female and male religious, and covers 29,639 square kilometers(11,448 square miles).  There are 9,414 faithful for each priest.

Bishops

Ordinaries
Manuel Talamás Camandari † (21 May 1957 Appointed - 11 Jul 1992 Retired, Died 10 May 2005)
Juan Sandoval Íñiguez (11 Jul 1992 Succeeded - 21 Apr 1994 Appointed, Archbishop of Guadalajara, Jalisco); elevated to Cardinal in 1994
Renato Ascencio León † (7 Oct 1994 Appointed - 20 Dec 2014 Retired, Died 27 Jun 2022)
José Guadalupe Torres Campos (20 Dec 2014 Appointed - )

†-deceased

Coadjutor bishop
 Juan Sandoval Íñiguez (1988-1992)

Auxiliary bishop
 José Guadalupe Torres Campos (2005-2008, appointed Bishop here

Other priest of this diocese who became bishop
 Gerardo de Jesús Rojas López, appointed Bishop of Nuevo Casas Grandes, Chihuahua in 2004

References

 

Ciudad Juarez
Christian organizations established in 1957
Roman Catholic dioceses and prelatures established in the 20th century
Ciudad Juarez, Roman Catholic Diocese of